The 1962–63 Northern Football League season was the 66th in the history of Northern Football League, a football competition in England.

Clubs

Division One featured 16 clubs which competed in the league last season, no new clubs joined the league this season.

League table

References

Northern Football League seasons
1962–63 in English football leagues